Qustul is an archaeological cemetery located on the eastern bank of the Nile in Lower Nubia, just opposite of Ballana near the Sudan frontier. The site has archaeological records from the A-Group culture, the New Kingdom of Egypt and the X-Group culture.

A-Group records 
Three significant A-group culture cemeteries of the times of the First Dynasty of Egypt have been excavated, which is located in present-day Egypt what was once Lower Nubia at least 5800 years ago. The most important one, cemetery L, revealed wealthy burials of rulers. In one of these graves was found an incense burner believed by Bruce Williams of the Oriental Institute at the University of Chicago depicting images assigned to the Pharaoh including a shape of the White Crown of Upper Egypt. 

Bruce Williams argued in 1987 that his discovery of the Qutsul incense burner advanced no claim of a Nubian origin or genesis for the pharaonic monarchy but that the archaeological data shows Nubian linkages and influence in helping to "fashion pharaonic civilization", including detailed excavations of the burial place of the Nubian rulers with date stamps well before the historical First Dynasty of Egypt. The size and wealth of the tombs were also described as vastly greater than that of the well-known Abydos tombs in Egypt.

This theory has been directly contradicted by more recent discoveries at Abydos in Upper Egypt which prove that the Egyptian monarchy predates the tombs at Qustul. The archaeological cemeteries at Qustul are no longer available for excavations since the flooding of Lake Nasser. According to David Wengrow, the A-Group polity of the late 4th millenninum BCE is poorly understood since most of the archaeological remains are submerged underneath Lake Nasser.   

Focusing on the A-Group culture (3500–2800 BCE), Michinori argued in 2000 that external influence from Nubia on the formation of Ancient Egypt in the pre-dynastic period to the dynasty period predates influence from eastern Mesopotamia. According to him, chiefs of the same cultural level as Upper Egyptian powers existed in Lower Nubia and exhibited pharaonic iconography before the unification of Egypt.

Maria Carmela Gatto wrote in 2020 that Bruce Williams' statement was misunderstood as a claim that the Egyptian pharaonic monarchy originated in Nubia, leading to criticism from scholars such as William Y. Adams. Williams explicitly denied making such a sweeping claim, saying that he was only trying to "raise the strong possibility that Egypt’s founding dynasty originated near Qustul and that the unification was accomplished from Nubia”. Gatto added that the "Whatever the claim, the (for some scholars) inconceivable idea of a primary role for Nubia in the rise of the Egyptian monarchy has been reconsidered after more recent finds in Upper Egypt dating back to the Naqada I period the early manifestations of elite iconography." while noting "That the tombs found in Qustul were exceptional and comparable to those of the earliest Egyptian rulers remains, nevertheless, a fact."

X-Group records 

A necropolis of the X-Group excavated by Walter Emery in 1931–1933 features large grave tumulae with bed burials for the kings with funeral sacrifices of horses, horse trappings and servants from the fourth to the sixth century CE. The royal nature of the burials is confirmed by the presence of bodies which were still wearing their crowns at the time of their discovery.

References

External links
Nubia Museum: Ballana and Qustul
Nubia Museum: The X Group or Ballana Culture

History of Nubia
Archaeological sites in Egypt
Aswan Governorate